Tarek Al Taib (born 28 February 1977) is a Libyan football midfielder.

Club career
Al-Taib began his career in Libya with Al Ahli Tripoli. In his first year, he played 26 matches and scored 11 goals, coming third in the 1997–1998 Libyan Player of the Year award. He then went on to win the award five times in 1999, 2000, 2002, 2003 and 2005. On 6 September 2013, he signed a one-year contract with Oman Professional League club Al-Suwaiq Club. El Taib played professionally in Turkey and Tunisia.

Offers
In 1995, a scout sent from Juventus went to Libya to search for young potential, he chose Tariq Al Taib and he went with him to Italy and trained with Juventus for a month. Juventus were impressed and decided to buy him, but the Libyan Football Federation did not grant him a license to play in Italy. In 2000, he went to West Ham United and played with them in a friendly match against Arsenal which ended with Arsenal winning 2–1, in which Tariq Al Taib scored West Ham's goal. Arsenal were interested in buying him but again, he was unable to get a license to play in England. In 2003, after a friendly match against Argentina, in which Tariq Al Taib put in a strong performance and scored a remarkable goal, receiving a pass from a team-mate near the corner post, running down the wing past two players and then scoring at nearly a 180-degree angle. He then received an offer from the Spanish club Valencia but the Libyan authorities restricted his potential career at the highest level.

International career
El Taib captained the side during the 2006 World Cup Qualifiers and the African Nations Cup. He was Libya's captain during the 2012 Africa Cup of Nations qualifiers, but was exiled from the side after he spoke out against teammates who supported rebel groups fighting in the First Libyan Civil War in 2011.

El Taib scored 23 goals in 78 appearances for Libya.

In the Championship Manager video game, his name was rendered as "Tarek Ettayeb".

Career statistics

Club

Honours

Club

Al-Hilal
 Saudi Professional League (1): 2007–08
 Crown Prince Cup (2): 2007–08, 2008–09

References

External links

TFF statistics

1977 births
Living people
Libyan footballers
Libyan expatriate footballers
Libya international footballers
2006 Africa Cup of Nations players
CS Sfaxien players
Al Hilal SFC players
Gaziantepspor footballers
Association football midfielders
Al-Shabab FC (Riyadh) players
Muaither SC players
S.C. Beira-Mar players
al-Nasr SC (Kuwait) players
Misr Lel Makkasa SC players
Süper Lig players
Expatriate footballers in Italy
Expatriate footballers in Turkey
Expatriate footballers in Kuwait
Expatriate footballers in Egypt
Expatriate footballers in Oman
Expatriate footballers in Saudi Arabia
Expatriate footballers in Qatar
People from Tripoli, Libya
Suwaiq Club players
Libyan expatriate sportspeople in Italy
Libyan expatriate sportspeople in Kuwait
Libyan expatriate sportspeople in Qatar
Libyan expatriate sportspeople in Saudi Arabia
Libyan expatriate sportspeople in Egypt
Libyan expatriate sportspeople in Turkey
Libyan expatriate sportspeople in Oman
Al-Ahli SC (Tripoli) players
Saudi Professional League players
Qatari Second Division players
Kuwait Premier League players
Libyan Premier League players